The 1891 Western Reserve football team represented Adelbert College of Western Reserve University—now known as Case Western Reserve University—in the American city of Cleveland, Ohio, during the 1891 college football season. The team outscored opponents by a combined 160–42, led by star players Billy Stage and Tug Wilson.  Also playing end for the team was Scott Stewart.  In the short lived conference, the team was a perfect 4–0 in the Ohio Intercollegiate Athletic Association.

During the final game of the season, in the first ever match up against rival Case School of Applied Science, William Rhodes of Yale and Edward M. Tillinghast of the Cleveland Athletic Club, were the team's first ever coaches.

Schedule

References

Western Reserve
Case Western Reserve Spartans football seasons
Western Reserve Football